is a Japanese manga series written and illustrated by Natsuki Takaya; it serves as a sequel to Takaya's previous work Fruits Basket. It was serialized on the HanaLaLa Online manga website from September 2015 to August 2017 and on the Manga Park website from August 2017 to April 2020. The series' individual chapters were collected into four volumes.

The sequel was originally created by Takaya to promote the main series' collector's edition and did not feature the main cast from the main series. Critical reception was mixed with many critics offering praise for the artwork and characters, while criticizing the story.

Plot

Development
The series was originally created to promote the collector's edition release of the main series. Additionally, Takaya stated that the main characters from the original series, Tohru, Yuki, and Kyo, would not appear in the story.

Publication

Written and illustrated by Natsuki Takaya, the manga began publication on Hakusensha's HanaLaLa Online manga website on September 4, 2015. In August 2017, the series was moved to Manga Park following HanaLaLa Onlines discontinuation. The series was originally set to be twelve chapters and three tankōbon volumes. Following the twelfth chapter's publication, it was announced that a one-shot by Takaya was in development. This one-shot became the series' thirteenth and final chapter, which was released on April 20, 2020, in three parts. The series' individual chapters were collected into a total of four tankōbon volumes.

In November 2017, Yen Press announced that they licensed the series for English publication.

Reception
Overall critical reception was mixed. Koiwai, Gathea, and Einah from Manga News offered praise for the artwork and characters, though they felt the story was a bit slow. Hilary Leung from CBR praised the characters, though felt the story was not fully fleshed-out. Kory Cerjak from The Fandom Post praised the artwork and characters, though he felt the overall story was a bit underwhelming. Sean Gaffney from A Case Suitable for Treatment praised the new characters, though felt the story was boring. Faustine Lillaz from Planete BD felt the manga was a solid return to the series for hard-core fans, though she also criticized the plot as thin.

Manga artist Mengo Yokoyari praised the new characters and their designs. At San Diego Comic-Con 2018, Brigid Alverson picked the series as the worst manga for anyone, any age.

References

External links
  
 

Fruits Basket
Hakusensha manga
Romance anime and manga
School life in anime and manga
Shōjo manga
Yen Press titles